Breed = Standartbred ,
Sire = Andover Hall ,
Grandsire = Garland Lobell ,
Sex = Stallion ,
Foaled = 2004 ,
Country = United States .

Donato Hanover (foaled 3 April 2004) is a retired Standardbred race horse who was voted the 2007 United States Harness Horse of the Year.  He was sired by Andover Hall, out of D Train, a Donerail mare.  The colt is currently owned by David B. Scharf, Steven Arnold, and Golden Touch Stable.  Donato Hanover earned $2,983,858 during his racing career.

The most notable of Donato Hanover's achievements include wins of the 2007 Hambletonian, the 2007 Kentucky Futurity, the 2007 World Trotting Derby, the 2007 Canadian Trotting Classic, as well as the 2006 Breeders Crown 2YO Colt & Gelding Trot.  The colt was the recipient of the 2006 Dan Patch Award for Two-Year-Old Male Trotter.

By winning the Kentucky Futurity, in a world-record 1:50.1, Donato became the first trotter to win more than $2 million in a single season ($2,198,540).

For much of his career, the only loss that he had endured was in his first career start, a non-parimutuel race, considered by some to be a "schooler with a purse". This led to some debate amongst people as to whether or not races such as this should really be considered a loss, and hence that Donato's career should be viewed as perfect. On 17 November 2007, any debate surrounding a so-called perfect career came to an end, when Donato lost, in the stretch, to Arch Madness in the Breeder's Crown eliminations. Despite this loss, during the following week, trainer Steve Elliott, as well as many other notable horsepeople, including superstar driver John Campbell, believed that Donato would rebound with an easy win in the finals, despite the handicap of having drawn post 10. The following Saturday, Donato went off as a 3-5 favorite in the $610,000 final and gunned straight for the lead. The colt was parked until the 3/8 mile mark when he took the lead.  He led the race into the stretch, but it was deja vu when Arch Madness took the stretch drive lead and Donato ran out of steam.

The Breeder's Crown marked the end of Donato's career.

The horse began his stud career at Hanover Shoe Farms in 2008.

In 2014 Donato Hanover was inducted into the Harness Racing Museum & Hall of Fame.

Wins

References

2004 racehorse births
American Standardbred racehorses
Racehorses bred in the United States
Racehorses trained in the United States
American Champion harness horses
Harness Horse of the Year winners
United States Harness Racing Hall of Fame inductees